Lydney is a town and civil parish in Gloucestershire, England. It is on the west bank of the River Severn in the Forest of Dean District, and is 16 miles (25 km) southwest of Gloucester. The town has been bypassed by the A48 road since 1995. The population was about 8,960 in the 2001 census, reducing to 8,766 at the 2011 census. Increasing to 10,043 at the 2021 Census.

Lydney has a harbour on the Severn, created when the Lydney Canal was built. Adjoining the town, Lydney Park gardens have a Roman temple dedicated to Nodens.

Etymology

According to Cook (1906) the toponym "Lydney" derives from the Old English *Lydan-eġ, "Lludd's Island", which could connect it with the name Nudd/Nodens. However, alternative etymologies of Lydney are offered in other sources. A. D. Mills suggests "island or river-meadow of the sailor, or of a man named *Lida", citing the forms "Lideneg" from c. 853 and "Ledenei" from the 1086 Domesday Book.

History

In the Iron Age a promontory fort was established at Lydney Park and later used for iron ore mining. In the late Roman period, a Roman temple to Nodens was built on the site of the fort.

In 1588 the Vice-Admiral of England Sir William Winter was granted the manor of Lydney in recognition of his services against the Spanish Armada. White Cross Manor, the house he built soon after he bought the manor, was burned down in 1645. In 1723 the Winter family sold their Lydney estate to the Bathurst family

In 1810, docks were constructed to capitalise on the town's location, close to the River Severn. The River Lyd flows through the town and into the Severn.

In 1935, Charles Bathurst was created Viscount Bledisloe of Lydney upon his retirement as Governor-General of New Zealand.

In 1940, the Pine End Works was built on Harbour Road, a Government run shadow factory producing plywood for the aircraft industry.

On 31 August 1962, the Beatles played at Lydney Town Hall.

The Lydney Murder, 1964

In 1964 the town was the site of the Lydney Murder, a significant case in the history of the use of entomology to assist criminal investigations. On 28 June 1964 a body was found in woods near Bracknell. By studying the maggots found on the body, forensic entomologist Professor Keith Simpson was able to establish a date of death of around 16 June 1964. Missing persons records for that date led the police to believe that the body was that of Peter Thomas, who had gone missing from his home in Lydney. Fingerprints confirmed the identification. William Brittle, a business partner of Thomas, was convicted of the murder. The Lydney Murder was the subject of an episode of the Discovery Channel documentary: "Crime Museum UK with Martin Kemp".

Transport

The Severn Railway Bridge crossed just north of Lydney from Purton to Sharpness on the eastern bank. Built in the 1870s, it was damaged beyond repair by a pair of oil tanker barges in 1960. The barges hit Pier 17 bringing down two bowstring girders. There have been several plans to renew the link.

Lydney railway station, run by Transport for Wales which serves the town, is located on the Gloucester to Newport Line, with connections from the town centre by the Dean Forest Railway. Lydney Canal was once an important harbour for shipping timber, coal and iron from the Forest of Dean. It is now a harbour for pleasure craft.

The original name of Mumford Body & Engineering Company Limited was changed to Lydney Coachworks Limited in 1947 to continue bus bodybuilding work. Orders came mainly from local companies such as Red & White, United Welsh and Newbury & District plus a surprise order from Leigh Corporation in Lancashire. After only a short time the coachworks closed down in March 1952, the uncompleted orders being transferred to Bristol TCC and Eastern Coach Works.

Government and politics

Lydney is covered by a three-tier system of local government. The upper authority is Gloucestershire County Council which is based in Shire Hall, Gloucester. The second tier being Forest of Dean District Council, based in Coleford which is a non-metropolitan district council.

The lowest tier of local government is Lydney Town Council which covers an area of approximately 8 square miles. The council was awarded "Quality Gold" standard in September 2015 in a national award scheme for local councils.

Secondary education
 Lydney Grammar School (1903–1973)
 Whitecross School (1973–2012)
 The Dean Academy (2012 to present)

Sport, recreation and arts
The town's rugby football club plays rugby union and is based at Regentsholme. The club had successful runs in the John Player Cup during the 1980s, including a match against Sale F.C. which was televised on the BBC's Rugby Special. There is also a leisure centre which contains an indoor swimming pool, a gym and more.

Lydney Cricket Club is an English amateur cricket club that was founded in 1862 and has been based on The Bob Park Cricket Ground on Swan Road since 1949.
Lydney CC have 3 Saturday senior XI teams. The 1st and 2nd XI compete in the Gloucestershire County Cricket League, the 3rd XI are in the Cheltenham, Gloucester and Forest of Dean League. They also have a Midweek senior XI team in the Forest of Dean Midweek League, a Sunday XI team that play the occasional friendly matches in and around the local district, and an established junior training section that play competitive cricket in the Leadon Vale Youth Cricket League. Former Glamorgan captain and England opening batsman Steve James began his career at the club. Lydney was also the club of first English club of England wicket-keeper Geraint Jones.

Lydney Town F.C. is based at the town's recreation ground, they run a total of 4 sides playing Hellenic Football League, Gloucestershire Northern Senior League and 2 sides in the North Gloucestershire Football League.

Lydney Hockey Club (Field Hockey) and Lyndean Netball Club play their home games at Whitecross School.

Lydney Golf Club was a nine-hole course located off Lakeside Avenue. The club has built a new course on a site located on the opposite side of the Lydney Bypass.

Lydney has an outdoor swimming pool, the Bathurst Swimming Pool built in the 1920s, open from May until early September. It is operated by volunteers (excluding the life guards).

Freedom Leisure Lydney is located at the Dean Academy, the local secondary school.

Lydney Twonkers Scrabble Club play their home games at the town's library. The Twonkers were Western Area Scrabble League champions in 2001 and 2005 and were twice runners-up in the National Scrabble Club Knockout Tournament in 1999 and 2003.

Bathurst Park in the centre of the town (not to be confused with Lydney Park on the town's outskirts) is home to several senior and junior football and cricket teams.

Lydney Town Band is a British-style brass band that was founded in 1892. The organisation operates three ensembles, the Town Band, the Training Band, and a Starter Group. The Town Band is a competitive band nationally graded in the Third Section, competing in various competitions throughout the year and regularly delivering concerts in the local community. In 2016 the Town Band qualified to represent the West of England at the National Brass Band Championship of Great Britain (Fourth Section) and in 2022 celebrated its 130th anniversary. The Training Band and Starter Group offer tuition for people at various stages of learning to play brass instruments, and regularly perform at events and concerts in the local community. 

Lydney parkrun started on 2 January 2016 - the free 5k timed weekly run, starts near to the garage block at Lydney Boating Lake and comprises three laps.

Tourism
 Norchard is the home of the Dean Forest Railway. 
 Lydney Park is the site of a Romano-British Roman Temple and was an Iron Age hillfort. It also has gardens which are open to the public for a limited period each spring.
 Taurus Crafts, which also occupies a section of the Lydney Park estate, is a Camphill community and popular visitor destination comprising a variety of craft shops and café.

Twinned towns
 Bréhal, Manche, northwest France

Organisations
 614 (Lydney) Squadron Air Training Corps
 586 (Lydney) Sea Cadet Corps
 Lydney and District Dramatic Society

Notable people
See :Category:People from Lydney
 Charles Bathurst, Lord Bledisloe (1867-1958), Governor-General of New Zealand from 1930 to 1935, who became Viscount Bledisloe of Lydney in 1935
 Christopher Herbert (1944- ), Bishop of St Albans from 1996 to 2009
 Herbert Howells (1892-1983), composer
 Steve James, England cricketer and captain of Glamorgan CCC
 Lisa Rogers, television presenter
 Sir William Winter (died 1589), Vice-Admiral of Queen Elizabeth I
 Sir John Winter (died 1676), grandson of William, and prominent royalist during the English Civil War

See also 

 Lydney power station

References

External links

 Information from the Royal Forest of Dean website.
 Lydney Grammar School – History site
 Whitecross School – Official site
 Dean Forest Railway
 Historic pictures of the Lydney and area.
 British History page for Lydney
 Roman-Britain.org page for Lydney Park Temple Complex
 Photos of Lydney and area on Geograph

 
Towns in Gloucestershire
Populated places on the River Severn
Forest of Dean
Towns of the Welsh Marches